"Uh-Uh Ooh-Ooh Look Out (Here It Comes)" is the Ashford & Simpson-penned, 1989 single by Roberta Flack.  The single was the follow-up to her number one R&B hit, "Oasis".  "Uh-Uh Ooh-Ooh Look Out (Here It Comes)" stalled at number thirty-seven on the U.S. R&B singles chart, failing to chart on the Billboard Hot 100.  In addition, a remix of the single made it to number one on the dance club play chart for one week. Ashford & Simpson recorded the song themselves for the soundtrack of the 1998 film, Down In The Delta.

References

1989 singles
Roberta Flack songs
Songs written by Valerie Simpson
Songs written by Nickolas Ashford
1989 songs